Campion College is a private Roman Catholic university college federated with the University of Regina and affiliated with the Jesuits (Society of Jesus). It is an undergraduate liberal arts college offering courses leading to a bachelor's degree in the arts, sciences and fine arts. The college has its own staff, faculty and infrastructure, including administrative and faculty offices, a chapel, a library, an auditorium, a cafeteria, lounges and common areas, classrooms, and tutoring centres.

See also 
 University of Regina
 Higher education in Saskatchewan
 List of Jesuit sites

References

External links 
 http://campioncollege.ca/

University of Regina
Regina, Campion College
Catholic universities and colleges in Canada
Educational institutions established in 1917
1917 establishments in Saskatchewan